Sleep apnea, also spelled sleep apnoea, is a sleep disorder in which pauses in breathing or periods of shallow breathing during sleep occur more often than normal. Each pause can last for a few seconds to a few minutes and they happen many times a night. In the most common form, this follows loud snoring. There may be a choking or snorting sound as breathing resumes. Because the disorder disrupts normal sleep, those affected may experience sleepiness or feel tired during the day. In children, it may cause hyperactivity or problems in school.

Sleep apnea may be either obstructive sleep apnea (OSA), in which breathing is interrupted by a blockage of air flow, central sleep apnea (CSA), in which regular unconscious breath simply stops, or a combination of the two. OSA is the most common form. OSA has four key contributors; these include a narrow, crowded, or collapsible upper airway, an ineffective pharyngeal dilator muscle function during sleep, airway narrowing during sleep and unstable control of breathing (high loop gain). It is often a chronic condition. Other risk factors include being overweight, a family history of the condition, allergies, and enlarged tonsils. Some people with sleep apnea are unaware they have the condition. In many cases it is first observed by a family member. Sleep apnea is often diagnosed with an overnight sleep study. For a diagnosis of sleep apnea, more than five episodes per hour must occur.

In central sleep apnea (CSA), the basic neurological controls for breathing rate malfunction and fail to give the signal to inhale, causing the individual to miss one or more cycles of breathing. If the pause in breathing is long enough, the percentage of oxygen in the circulation will drop to a lower than normal level (hypoxaemia) and the concentration of carbon dioxide will build to a higher than normal level (hypercapnia). In turn, these conditions of hypoxia and hypercapnia will trigger additional effects on the body. Brain cells need constant oxygen to live, and if the level of blood oxygen goes low enough for long enough, brain damage and even death will occur.
A systemic disorder, sleep apnea is associated with a wide array of effects, including increased risk of car accidents, hypertension, cardiovascular disease, myocardial infarction, stroke, atrial fibrillation, insulin resistance, higher incidence of cancer, and neurodegeneration. The exact effects of the condition will depend on how severe the apnea is and on the individual characteristics of the person having the apnea.

Treatment may include lifestyle changes, mouthpieces, breathing devices, and surgery. Effective lifestyle changes may include avoiding alcohol, losing weight, stopping smoking, and sleeping on one's side. Breathing devices include the use of a CPAP machine. With proper use, CPAP improves outcomes. Evidence suggests that CPAP may improve sensitivity to insulin, blood pressure, and sleepiness. Long term compliance, however, is an issue with more than half of people not appropriately using the device. In 2017, only 15% of potential patients in developed countries used CPAP machines, while in developing countries well under 1% of potential patients used CPAP. Without treatment, sleep apnea may increase the risk of heart attack, stroke, diabetes, heart failure, irregular heartbeat, obesity, and motor vehicle collisions.

Alzheimer's disease and severe obstructive sleep apnea are connected because there is an increase in the protein beta-amyloid as well as white-matter damage.  These are the main indicators of Alzheimer's, which in this case comes from the lack of proper rest or poorer sleep efficiency resulting in neurodegeneration.  Having sleep apnea in mid-life brings a higher likelihood of developing Alzheimer's in older age, and if one has Alzheimer's then one is also more likely to have sleep apnea. This is demonstrated by cases of sleep apnea even being misdiagnosed as dementia. With the use of treatment through CPAP, there is a reversible risk factor in terms of the amyloid proteins.  This usually restores brain structure and diminishes cognitive impairment.

OSA is a common sleep disorder. A large analysis in 2019 of the estimated prevalence of OSA found that OSA affects 936 million—1 billion people between the ages of 30–69 globally, or roughly every 1 in 10 people, and up to 30% of the elderly. Sleep apnea is somewhat more common in men than women, roughly a 2:1 ratio of men to women, and in general more people are likely to have it with older age and obesity.

Signs and symptoms
People with sleep apnea have problems with excessive daytime sleepiness (EDS) and impaired alertness. OSA may increase risk for driving accidents and work-related accidents. If OSA is not treated, people are at increased risk of other health problems, such as diabetes.

Due to the disruption in daytime cognitive state, behavioral effects may be present. These can include moodiness, belligerence, as well as a decrease in attentiveness and energy. These effects may become intractable, leading to depression.

There is evidence that the risk of diabetes among those with moderate or severe sleep apnea is higher. Finally, because there are many factors that could lead to some of the effects previously listed, some people are not aware that they have sleep apnea and are either misdiagnosed or ignore the symptoms altogether.

Risk factors
Sleep apnea can affect people regardless of sex, race, or age. However, risk factors include:

 being male
 obesity
 age over 40
 large neck circumference (greater than 16–17 inches)
 enlarged tonsils or tongue
 narrow upper jaw
 nasal congestion
 allergies
 receding chin
 gastroesophageal reflux
 a family history of sleep apnea
 smoking

Alcohol, sedatives and tranquilizers may also promote sleep apnea by relaxing throat muscles. People who smoke tobacco have sleep apnea at three times the rate of people who have never done so.

Central sleep apnea is more often associated with any of the following risk factors:

 being male
 an age above 65
 having heart disorders such as atrial fibrillation or atrial septal defects such as PFO
 stroke

High blood pressure is very common in people with sleep apnea.

Mechanism
When breathing is paused, carbon dioxide builds up in the bloodstream. Chemoreceptors in the bloodstream note the high carbon dioxide levels. The brain is signaled to awaken the person, which clears the airway and allows breathing to resume. Breathing normally will restore oxygen levels and the person will fall asleep again. This carbon dioxide build-up may be due to the decrease of output of the brainstem regulating the chest wall or pharyngeal muscles, which causes the pharynx to collapse. People with sleep apnea experience reduced or no slow-wave sleep and spend less time in REM sleep.

Complications 
OSA is a serious medical condition. Daytime fatigue and sleepiness, cardiovascular problems and eye problems are considered potential complications of OSA. OSA may also be a risk factor of COVID-19. People with OSA have a higher risk of developing severe complications of COVID-19.

Diagnosis

Despite this medical consensus, the variety of apneic events (e.g., hypopnea vs apnea, central vs obstructive), the variability of patients' physiologies, and the inherent shortcomings and variability of equipment and methods, this field is subject to debate.
Within this context, the definition of an event depends on several factors (e.g., patient's age) and account for this variability through a multi-criteria decision rule described in several, sometimes conflicting, guidelines.

Oximetry
Oximetry, which may be performed over one or several nights in a person's home, is a simpler, but less reliable alternative to a polysomnography. The test is recommended only when requested by a physician and should not be used to test those without symptoms. Home oximetry may be effective in guiding prescription for automatically self-adjusting continuous positive airway pressure.

Classification
There are three types of sleep apnea. OSA accounts for 84%, CSA for 0.9%, and 15% of cases are mixed.

Obstructive sleep apnea

Obstructive sleep apnea (OSA) is the most common category of sleep-disordered breathing. The muscle tone of the body ordinarily relaxes during sleep, and at the level of the throat, the human airway is composed of collapsible walls of soft tissue that can obstruct breathing. Mild occasional sleep apnea, such as many people experience during an upper respiratory infection, may not be significant, but chronic severe obstructive sleep apnea requires treatment to prevent low blood oxygen (hypoxemia), sleep deprivation, and other complications.

Individuals with low muscle-tone and soft tissue around the airway (e.g., because of obesity) and structural features that give rise to a narrowed airway are at high risk for obstructive sleep apnea. The elderly are more likely to have OSA than young people. Men are more likely to develop sleep apnea than women and children are, though it is not uncommon in the last two population groups.

The risk of OSA rises with increasing body weight, active smoking and age. In addition, patients with diabetes or "borderline" diabetes have up to three times the risk of having OSA.

Common symptoms include loud snoring, restless sleep, and sleepiness during the daytime. Diagnostic tests include home oximetry or polysomnography in a sleep clinic.

Some treatments involve lifestyle changes, such as avoiding alcohol or muscle relaxants, losing weight, and quitting smoking. Many people benefit from sleeping at a 30-degree elevation of the upper body or higher, as if in a recliner. Doing so helps prevent the gravitational collapse of the airway. Lateral positions (sleeping on a side), as opposed to supine positions (sleeping on the back), are also recommended as a treatment for sleep apnea, largely because the gravitational component is smaller in the lateral position. Some people benefit from various kinds of oral appliances such as the Mandibular advancement splint to keep the airway open during sleep. Continuous positive airway pressure (CPAP) is the most effective treatment for severe obstructive sleep apnea, but oral appliances are considered a first-line approach equal to CPAP for mild to moderate sleep apnea, according to the AASM parameters of care. There are also surgical procedures to remove and tighten tissue and widen the airway.

Snoring is a common finding in people with this syndrome. Snoring is the turbulent sound of air moving through the back of the mouth, nose, and throat. Although not everyone who snores is experiencing difficulty breathing, snoring in combination with other risk factors has been found to be highly predictive of OSA. The loudness of the snoring is not indicative of the severity of obstruction, however. If the upper airways are tremendously obstructed, there may not be enough air movement to make much sound. Even the loudest snoring does not mean that an individual has sleep apnea syndrome. The sign that is most suggestive of sleep apneas occurs when snoring stops.

Up to 78% of genes associated with habitual snoring also increase the risk for OSA.

Other indicators include (but are not limited to): hypersomnolence, obesity (BMI ≥ 30), large neck circumference— in women,  in men — enlarged tonsils and large tongue volume, micrognathia, morning headaches, irritability/mood-swings/depression, learning and/or memory difficulties, and sexual dysfunction.

The term "sleep-disordered breathing" is commonly used in the U.S. to describe the full range of breathing problems during sleep in which not enough air reaches the lungs (hypopnea and apnea). Sleep-disordered breathing is associated with an increased risk of cardiovascular disease, stroke, high blood pressure, arrhythmias, diabetes, and sleep deprived driving accidents. When high blood pressure is caused by OSA, it is distinctive in that, unlike most cases of high blood pressure (so-called essential hypertension), the readings do not drop significantly when the individual is sleeping. Stroke is associated with obstructive sleep apnea.

Obstructive sleep apnea is associated with problems in daytime functioning, such as daytime sleepiness, motor vehicle crashes, psychological problems, decreased cognitive functioning, and reduced quality of life. Other associated problems include cerebrovascular diseases (hypertension, coronary artery disease, and stroke) and diabetes. These problems could be, at least in part, caused by risk factors of OSA.

Central sleep apnea

In pure central sleep apnea or Cheyne–Stokes respiration, the brain's respiratory control centers are imbalanced during sleep. Blood levels of carbon dioxide, and the neurological feedback mechanism that monitors them, do not react quickly enough to maintain an even respiratory rate, with the entire system cycling between apnea and tachypnea, even during wakefulness. The sleeper stops breathing and then starts again. There is no effort made to breathe during the pause in breathing: there are no chest movements and no struggling. After the episode of apnea, breathing may be faster (tachypnea) for a period of time, a compensatory mechanism to blow off retained waste gases and absorb more oxygen.

While sleeping, a normal individual is "at rest" as far as cardiovascular workload is concerned. Breathing is regular in a healthy person during sleep, and oxygen levels and carbon dioxide levels in the bloodstream stay fairly constant. Any sudden drop in oxygen or excess of carbon dioxide (even if tiny) strongly stimulates the brain's respiratory centers to breathe.

In any person, hypoxia and hypercapnia have certain common effects on the body. The heart rate will increase, unless there are such severe co-existing problems with the heart muscle itself or the autonomic nervous system that makes this compensatory increase impossible. The more translucent areas of the body will show a bluish or dusky cast from cyanosis, which is the change in hue that occurs owing to lack of oxygen in the blood ("turning blue"). Overdoses of drugs that are respiratory depressants (such as heroin, and other opiates) kill by damping the activity of the brain's respiratory control centers. In central sleep apnea, the effects of sleep alone can remove the brain's mandate for the body to breathe.

 Normal Respiratory Drive: After exhalation, the blood level of oxygen decreases and that of carbon dioxide increases. Exchange of gases with a lungful of fresh air is necessary to replenish oxygen and rid the bloodstream of built-up carbon dioxide. Oxygen and carbon dioxide receptors in the blood stream (called chemoreceptors) send nerve impulses to the brain, which then signals reflex opening of the larynx (so that the opening between the vocal cords enlarges) and movements of the rib cage muscles and diaphragm. These muscles expand the thorax (chest cavity) so that a partial vacuum is made within the lungs and air rushes in to fill it.
 Physiologic effects of central apnea: During central apneas, the central respiratory drive is absent, and the brain does not respond to changing blood levels of the respiratory gases. No breath is taken despite the normal signals to inhale. The immediate effects of central sleep apnea on the body depend on how long the failure to breathe endures. At worst, central sleep apnea may cause sudden death. Short of death, drops in blood oxygen may trigger seizures, even in the absence of epilepsy. In people with epilepsy, the hypoxia caused by apnea may trigger seizures that had previously been well controlled by medications. In other words, a seizure disorder may become unstable in the presence of sleep apnea. In adults with coronary artery disease, a severe drop in blood oxygen level can cause angina, arrhythmias, or heart attacks (myocardial infarction). Longstanding recurrent episodes of apnea, over months and years, may cause an increase in carbon dioxide levels that can change the pH of the blood enough to cause a respiratory acidosis.

Mixed apnea
Some people with sleep apnea have a combination of both types; its prevalence ranges from 0.56% to 18%. The condition is generally detected when obstructive sleep apnea is treated with CPAP and central sleep apnea emerges. The exact mechanism of the loss of central respiratory drive during sleep in OSA is unknown but is most likely related to incorrect settings of the CPAP treatment and other medical conditions the person has.

Management
The treatment of obstructive sleep apnea is different than that of central sleep apnea. Treatment often starts with behavioral therapy. Many people are told to avoid alcohol, sleeping pills, and other sedatives, which can relax throat muscles, contributing to the collapse of the airway at night.

Changing sleep position 
More than half of people with obstructive sleep apnea have some degree of positional obstructive sleep apnea, meaning that it gets worse when they sleep on their backs.  Sleeping on their sides is an effective and cost-effective treatment for positional obstructive sleep apnea.

Continuous positive airway pressure

For moderate to severe sleep apnea, the most common treatment is the use of a continuous positive airway pressure (CPAP) or automatic positive airway pressure (APAP) device. These splint the person's airway open during sleep by means of pressurized air. The person typically wears a plastic facial mask, which is connected by a flexible tube to a small bedside CPAP machine.

Although CPAP therapy is effective in reducing apneas and less expensive than other treatments, some people find it uncomfortable. Some complain of feeling trapped, having chest discomfort, and skin or nose irritation. Other side effects may include dry mouth, dry nose, nosebleeds, sore lips and gums.

Whether or not it decreases the risk of death or heart disease is controversial with some reviews finding benefit and others not. This variation across studies might be driven by low rates of compliance—analyses of those who use CPAP for at least four hours a night suggests a decrease in cardiovascular events.

Weight loss
Excess body weight is thought to be an important cause of sleep apnea. People who are overweight have more tissues in the back of their throat which can restrict the airway, especially when sleeping. In weight loss studies of overweight individuals, those who lose weight show reduced apnea frequencies and improved apnoea–hypopnoea index (AHI). Weight loss effective enough to relieve obesity hypoventilation syndrome (OHS) must be 25–30% of body weight. For some obese people, it can be difficult to achieve and maintain this result without bariatric surgery.

Rapid palatal expansion

In children, orthodontic treatment to expand the volume of the nasal airway, such as nonsurgical rapid palatal expansion is common. The procedure has been found to significantly decrease the AHI and lead to long-term resolution of clinical symptoms.

Since the palatal suture is fused in adults, regular RPE using tooth-borne expanders cannot be performed. Mini-implant assisted rapid palatal expansion (MARPE) has been recently developed as a non-surgical option for the transverse expansion of the maxilla in adults. This method increases the volume of the nasal cavity and nasopharynx, leading to increased airflow and reduced respiratory arousals during sleep. Changes are permanent with minimal complications.

Surgery

Several surgical procedures (sleep surgery) are used to treat sleep apnea, although they are normally a third line of treatment for those who reject or are not helped by CPAP treatment or dental appliances. Surgical treatment for obstructive sleep apnea needs to be individualized to address all anatomical areas of obstruction.

Nasal obstruction
Often, correction of the nasal passages needs to be performed in addition to correction of the oropharynx passage. Septoplasty and turbinate surgery may improve the nasal airway, but has been found to be ineffective at reducing respiratory arousals during sleep.

Pharyngeal obstruction
Tonsillectomy and uvulopalatopharyngoplasty (UPPP or UP3) are available to address pharyngeal obstruction.

The "Pillar" device is a treatment for snoring and obstructive sleep apnea; it is thin, narrow strips of polyester. Three strips are inserted into the roof of the mouth (the soft palate) using a modified syringe and local anesthetic, in order to stiffen the soft palate. This procedure addresses one of the most common causes of snoring and sleep apnea — vibration or collapse of the soft palate. It was approved by the FDA for snoring in 2002 and for obstructive sleep apnea in 2004. A 2013 meta-analysis found that "the Pillar implant has a moderate effect on snoring and mild-to-moderate obstructive sleep apnea" and that more studies with high level of evidence were needed to arrive at a definite conclusion; it also found that the polyester strips work their way out of the soft palate in about 10% of the people in whom they are implanted.

Hypopharyngeal or base of tongue obstruction
Base-of-tongue advancement by means of advancing the genial tubercle of the mandible, tongue suspension, or hyoid suspension (aka hyoid myotomy and suspension or hyoid advancement) may help with the lower pharynx.

Other surgery options may attempt to shrink or stiffen excess tissue in the mouth or throat, procedures done at either a doctor's office or a hospital. Small shots or other treatments, sometimes in a series, are used for shrinkage, while the insertion of a small piece of stiff plastic is used in the case of surgery whose goal is to stiffen tissues.

Multi-level surgery
Maxillomandibular advancement (MMA) is considered the most effective surgery for people with sleep apnea, because it increases the posterior airway space (PAS). However, health professionals are often unsure as to who should be referred for surgery and when to do so: some factors in referral may include failed use of CPAP or device use; anatomy which favors rather than impedes surgery; or significant craniofacial abnormalities which hinder device use.

Potential complications
Several inpatient and outpatient procedures use sedation. Many drugs and agents used during surgery to relieve pain and to depress consciousness remain in the body at low amounts for hours or even days afterwards. In an individual with either central, obstructive or mixed sleep apnea, these low doses may be enough to cause life-threatening irregularities in breathing or collapses in a patient's airways. Use of analgesics and sedatives in these patients postoperatively should therefore be minimized or avoided.

Surgery on the mouth and throat, as well as dental surgery and procedures, can result in postoperative swelling of the lining of the mouth and other areas that affect the airway. Even when the surgical procedure is designed to improve the airway, such as tonsillectomy and adenoidectomy or tongue reduction, swelling may negate some of the effects in the immediate postoperative period. Once the swelling resolves and the palate becomes tightened by postoperative scarring, however, the full benefit of the surgery may be noticed.

A person with sleep apnea undergoing any medical treatment must make sure their doctor and anesthetist are informed about the sleep apnea. Alternative and emergency procedures may be necessary to maintain the airway of sleep apnea patients.

Other

Neurostimulation
Diaphragm pacing, which involves the rhythmic application of electrical impulses to the diaphragm, has been used to treat central sleep apnea.

In April 2014, the U.S. Food and Drug Administration granted pre-market approval for use of an upper airway stimulation system in people who cannot use a continuous positive airway pressure device. The Inspire Upper Airway Stimulation system senses respiration and applies mild electrical stimulation during inspiration, which pushes the tongue slightly forward to open the airway.

Medications
There is currently insufficient evidence to recommend any medication for OSA. This may result in part because people with sleep apnea have tended to be treated as a single group in clinical trials. Identifying specific physiological factors underlying sleep apnea makes it possible to test drugs specific to those causal factors: airway narrowing, impaired muscle activity, low arousal threshold for waking, and unstable breathing control. 
Those who experience low waking thresholds may benefit from eszopiclone, a sedative typically used to treat insomnia. The  antidepressant desipramine may stimulate upper airway muscles and lessen pharyngeal collapsibility in people who have limited muscle function in their airways.

There is limited evidence for medication, but 2012 AASM guidelines suggested that acetazolamide "may be considered" for the treatment of central sleep apnea; zolpidem and triazolam may also be considered for the treatment of central sleep apnea, but "only if the patient does not have underlying risk factors for respiratory depression". 
Low doses of oxygen are also used as a treatment for hypoxia but are discouraged due to side effects.

Oral appliances
An oral appliance, often referred to as a mandibular advancement splint, is a custom-made mouthpiece that shifts the lower jaw forward and opens the bite slightly, opening up the airway. These devices can be fabricated by a general dentist. Oral appliance therapy (OAT) is usually successful in patients with mild to moderate obstructive sleep apnea. While CPAP is more effective for sleep apnea than oral appliances, oral appliances do improve sleepiness and quality of life and are often better tolerated than CPAP.

Nasal EPAP
Nasal EPAP is a bandage-like device placed over the nostrils that uses a person's own breathing to create positive airway pressure to prevent obstructed breathing.

Oral pressure therapy
Oral pressure therapy uses a device that creates a vacuum in the mouth, pulling the soft palate tissue forward. It has been found useful in about 25 to 37% of people.

Prognosis
Death could occur from untreated OSA due to lack of oxygen to the body.

There is increasing evidence that sleep apnea may lead to liver function impairment, particularly fatty liver diseases (see steatosis).

It has been revealed that people with OSA show tissue loss in brain regions that help store memory, thus linking OSA with memory loss. Using magnetic resonance imaging (MRI), the scientists discovered that people with sleep apnea have mammillary bodies that are about 20% smaller, particularly on the left side. One of the key investigators hypothesized that repeated drops in oxygen lead to the brain injury.

The immediate effects of central sleep apnea on the body depend on how long the failure to breathe endures. At worst, central sleep apnea may cause sudden death. Short of death, drops in blood oxygen may trigger seizures, even in the absence of epilepsy. In people with epilepsy, the hypoxia caused by apnea may trigger seizures that had previously been well controlled by medications. In other words, a seizure disorder may become unstable in the presence of sleep apnea. In adults with coronary artery disease, a severe drop in blood oxygen level can cause angina, arrhythmias, or heart attacks (myocardial infarction). Longstanding recurrent episodes of apnea, over months and years, may cause an increase in carbon dioxide levels that can change the pH of the blood enough to cause a respiratory acidosis.

Epidemiology

The Wisconsin Sleep Cohort Study estimated in 1993 that roughly one in every 15 Americans was affected by at least moderate sleep apnea. It also estimated that in middle-age as many as 9% of women and 24% of men were affected, undiagnosed and untreated.

The costs of untreated sleep apnea reach further than just health issues. It is estimated that in the U.S., the average untreated sleep apnea patient's annual health care costs $1,336 more than an individual without sleep apnea. This may cause $3.4 billion/year in additional medical costs. Whether medical cost savings occur with treatment of sleep apnea remains to be determined.

Frequency and population 
Sleep disorders including sleep apnea have been become an important health issue in the United States. Twenty-two million Americans have been estimated to have sleep apnea, with 80% of moderate and severe OSA cases undiagnosed.

OSA can occur at any age, but it happens more frequently in men who are over 40 and overweight.

History
A type of CSA was described in the German myth of Ondine's curse where the person when asleep would forget to breathe. The clinical picture of this condition has long been recognized as a character trait, without an understanding of the disease process. The term "Pickwickian syndrome" that is sometimes used for the syndrome was coined by the famous early 20th-century physician William Osler, who must have been a reader of Charles Dickens. The description of Joe, "the fat boy" in Dickens's novel The Pickwick Papers, is an accurate clinical picture of an adult with obstructive sleep apnea syndrome.

The early reports of obstructive sleep apnea in the medical literature described individuals who were very severely affected, often presenting with severe hypoxemia, hypercapnia and congestive heart failure.

Treatment
The management of obstructive sleep apnea was improved with the introduction of continuous positive airway pressure (CPAP), first described in 1981 by Colin Sullivan and associates in Sydney, Australia. The first models were bulky and noisy, but the design was rapidly improved and by the late 1980s, CPAP was widely adopted. The availability of an effective treatment stimulated an aggressive search for affected individuals and led to the establishment of hundreds of specialized clinics dedicated to the diagnosis and treatment of sleep disorders. Though many types of sleep problems are recognized, the vast majority of patients attending these centers have sleep-disordered breathing. Sleep apnea awareness day is April 18 in recognition of Colin Sullivan.

See also 

Congenital central hypoventilation syndrome
Modes of mechanical ventilation
Periodic breathing
Obesity hypoventilation syndrome
Respiratory disturbance index (RDI)
Upper airway resistance syndrome

References

External links 

Breathing abnormalities
Sleep disorders
Sleep physiology
Medical conditions related to obesity
Wikipedia medicine articles ready to translate
Wikipedia neurology articles ready to translate